The Delhi–Saharanpur–Dehradun Expressway is an under-construction 210 km long 12-lane (Delhi to EPE & 6-lane access controlled expressway in India with operational speed limit of 100 kmph (Designed for vehicular movement at 120 kmph) between Delhi and Dehradun. The expressway is spread across the states of Delhi, Uttar Pradesh and Uttarakhand and passes through  cities such as Baghpat, Baraut, Shamli and Saharanpur. It also has two additional spurs - 50.7 km long 6-lane Saharanpur-Roorke-Haridwar Expressway and 121 km long 6-lane Ambala-Shamli Expressway.

Salient Features

A 12 km-long elevated corridor will be constructed un the Rajaji National Park to protect wildlife, thus it will be the first highway in India to have a wildlife protection corridor, and also Asia's longest wildlife elevated corridor of 12 km for unrestricted wildlife movement. After completion of this expressway, the distance between the two cities would be reduced from 235 km to 210 km, while journey time would be reduced from 6.5 hours to only 2.5 hours.

 Length – 
 Number of Lanes – 6 lanes (extendable to 8 lanes)

Construction

The Expressway is proposed to developed in three phases: 

 Phase I - brownfield: 32 km long 12-lane stretch between Akshardham (Delhi) & proposed EPE Junction.

 Phase II - greenfield: between proposed EPE Junction in Delhi and Ganeshpur near Saharanpur bypass. 

 Phase III - greenfield: Expressway Stretch between Ganeshpur near Saharanpur bypass & Dehradun.

Route

This 210 km long expressway has two additional spurs.

 Main route Delhi –Saharanpur–Dehradun Expressway:

 Delhi-EPE: 12-lanes from Akshardham Temple Delhi to 32 km away intersection at Kherka with Eastern Peripheral Expressway (EPE) near east of Baghpat. 6.4 km long  Geeta Colony to Khajoori Khas is elevated.

 EPE-Saharanpur: 118 km long route with 6-lanes, 7 interchanges and 60 underpasses from EPE to Saharanpur east bypass via 
 Khekra (Baghpat eastern bypass), 
 Lohadda (Baraut eastern bypass), 
 Karaunda Mahajan (intersect NH709A Karnal-Meerut),
 Khyawari-Gogwan Jalalpur (just east of Thanabhawan on UP-SH12 Panipat-Muzaffarnagar),
 Sohanchida Mast at 108 km milestone (spur to Saharanpur-Roorke-Haridwar Expressway),
 Latifpur Aht (next to Lakhnaur on Saharanpur east bypass, at 119 km).

 Saharanpur-Rajaji National Park: 40 km long route with 6-lanes from Saharanpur east bypass to Ganeshpur in NH307 Latifpur Aht at southern entrance of Rajaji National Park.

 Rajaji National Park- Dehradun: 19.5 km long route runs through a 2-tube tunnel of total 2.322 km length, then 4.82 km long 4-lane elevated flyover of 6m vertical clearance underneath for elephants and wildlife, then 2.12 km at grade hill route, & 340m single-tube tunnel.

 Spurs: two spurs.

 Ambala-Gangoh-Shamli Expressway part of larger Bareilly-Ludhiana Economic Corridor: This 121.786 km long spur is part of 450 km long 6-lane Bareilly–Ludhiana Economic Corridor (Bareilly-Ludhiana Expressway), which is partially access-controlled, partially greenfield & rest upgrade of brownfield highway with March 2026 deadline. It has 3 sections, 90 km brownfield upgrade NH44 Ambala-Ludhiana, 121.78 km greenfield Ambala (Sadopur)-Shamli (Gogwan Jalalpur), 220 km greenfield Shamli (Gogwan Jalalpur)-Bareilly. Its future phase is Bareilly-Gorakhpur, which will connect with Siliguri–Gorakhpur Expressway. This spur begins at 
 Sadopur in north of Ambala,
 then runs as the northern & easetern bypass (Panjokhra) of Ambala, 
 southwestern byass of Saha,
 southwestern bypass of Barara (with additional spur from Barara to NH344 by upgrading HR-SH4), 
 western bypass of Radaur (east of Ladwa Kurukshetra),  
 Chandro (bridge on yamuna), eastern bypass of Gangoh, 
 to Delhi-Saharanpur-Dehradun Expressway at Gogwan Jalalpur just east of Thanabhawan in Shamli district.

  Saharanpur-Roorke-Haridwar Expressway: 50.7 km route begins at Sohanchida Mast from 108 km milestone of Delhi–Saharanpur–Dehradun Expressway southeast of Saharanpur, forms north bypass to Roorke, and ends at Bahadarabad on Haridwar west ringroad. This will have direct connectivity with the proposed Haridwar International Airport in the south or Haridwar, which will come up by 2030.

Inter-connectivity

This expressway connects with the following: 

 Eastern Peripheral Expressway between Delhi and Baghpat.

 Ambala-Shamli Expressway

 Saharanpur-Haridwar Expressway South East of Saharanpur.

Status updates

 Feb 2020: Central Government gives in principle approval for the expressway.

 Aug 2020: The proposed expressway to be ready by March 2024.

 Jan 2021: Tenders awarded for first two phases of main route from Akshardham to Baghpat district border and work is expected to start by month end. Tenders for remaining stages to be awarded after completion of land acquisition.

Nov 2021: Central Government sanctions ₹ 2,095 crore to build six-lane road connecting Haridwar with the expressway.

Dec 2021: Prime Minister Narendra Modi laid the foundation stone for the expressway on 4 December.

 Dec 2021: Tender for Roorkee & Haridwar Expressway spur awarded to Krishna Constellation.

 Jan 2022: Tender for Shamli–Ambala Expressway invited.

See also
 National Highway 709B (India)

References

External links
 National Highways Authority of India

Proposed expressways in India
Transport in Dehradun
Transport in Saharanpur
Expressways in Uttar Pradesh
Transport in Delhi